Maurizio Moretti (3 March 1945 – 30 March 2021) was an Italian professional footballer who played as a defender for SPAL. 

Moretti died of complications from COVID-19 during the COVID-19 pandemic in Italy in March 2021.

References

1945 births
2021 deaths
Italian footballers
S.P.A.L. players
Serie A players
Serie B players
Association football defenders
Deaths from the COVID-19 pandemic in Friuli Venezia Giulia